Johannes Nagele (born 1 June 1964) is an Austrian fencer. He competed in the individual épée event at the 1988 Summer Olympics.

References

External links
 

1964 births
Living people
Austrian male épée fencers
Olympic fencers of Austria
Fencers at the 1988 Summer Olympics